Walter Ricci (born 5 February 1946) is a French racing cyclist. His sporting career began with CSM Persan. He rode in the 1970 Tour de France.

References

External links
 

1946 births
Living people
French male cyclists
Place of birth missing (living people)